Duisburg-Meiderich Süd is a railway station in Duisburg, North Rhine-Westphalia, Germany serving the city district of Meiderich. The station is located on the Oberhausen–Duisburg-Ruhrort railway and is served by RB services operated by NordWestBahn There also is an adjacent underground Stadtbahn station which is named Meiderich Bahnhof (Meiderich station), although besides Meiderich Süd (southern station), there is another station in Meiderich, Meiderich Ost (eastern station).

Train services
The following services currently call at Duisburg-Meiderich Süd:

References

Meiderich Bahnhof
Railway stations in North Rhine-Westphalia
Buildings and structures in Duisburg
Transport in Duisburg